The Range Boss is a 1917 silent film western directed by W. S. Van Dyke and starring Jack Gardner. It was produced by the Essanay Film Company and released through K-E-S-E.

Cast
 Jack Gardner - Rex Randerson
 Ruth King - Ruth Harkness
 Carl Stockdale - Willard Masten

Preservation status
 A print is preserved in the George Eastman House, Rochester.

References

External links
 
 
  lantern slide

1917 films
1917 Western (genre) films
American black-and-white films
Essanay Studios films
Films directed by W. S. Van Dyke
Silent American Western (genre) films
1910s American films